The University of Buckingham (UB) is a non-profit private university in Buckingham, England and the oldest of the country's five private universities. It was founded as the University College at Buckingham (UCB) in 1973, admitting its first students in 1976. It was granted university status by royal charter in 1983. Buckingham offers bachelor's degrees, master's degrees, and doctorates through five "schools" (or faculties) of study.

Buckingham was closely linked to Margaret Thatcher, who as Education Secretary oversaw the creation of the university college in 1973, and as Prime Minister was instrumental in elevating it to a university in 1983 – thus creating the first private university in the UK since the establishment of the University Grants Committee in 1919. When she retired from politics in 1992, Margaret Thatcher became the university's second chancellor, a post she held until 1998. Buckingham's finances for teaching operate entirely on student fees and endowments; it does not receive direct state funding (via the Office for Students or Research England) although its students can receive student loans from the Student Loans Company. It has formal charity status as a not-for-profit institution dedicated to the ends of research and education.

History 

Some of the founding academics migrated from the University of Oxford, disillusioned or wary of aspects of the late-1960s ethos. On 27 May 1967, The Times published a letter from J. W. Paulley, a physician, who wrote:  Three London conferences followed which explored this idea.

The university was incorporated as the "University College of Buckingham" in 1976 and received its royal charter as a university from the Queen in 1983. As of May 2016, it is the only private university in the UK with a royal charter.

Its development was influenced by the Institute of Economic Affairs, in particular, Harry Ferns and Ralph Harris, heads of the institute. The university's foundation-stone was laid by Margaret Thatcher, who became the university's chancellor between 1993 and 1998.

The university was shaped by a succession of noted Vice-Chancellors: first by Lord Beloff (1913–1999), former Gladstone Professor of Politics at the University of Oxford; then Sir Alan Peacock, the economist, founder of the Economics department at the University of York, and Fellow of the British Academy. Subsequent VCs have been Dr Michael Barrett; then  Sir Richard Luce, now Lord Luce, the former Minister for the Arts; then Professor Robert Taylor; then Professor Terence Kealey; then Sir Anthony Seldon and, most recently, Professor James Tooley.

From 2004, students at Buckingham have been eligible for government student loans, which led to an increase in UK students at the university.

Campus

Near the centre of the town of Buckingham is the riverside campus, which is partly contained within a south-turning bend of the River Great Ouse. Here, on or just off Hunter Street, are some of the university's central buildings: Yeomanry House; the Anthony de Rothschild building (which contains Humanities); the Humanities Library; and also some of the student accommodation, looking northwards across the river. Prebend House, a recently restored Georgian house, contains the Vice-Chancellor's office. On the other side of Hunter Street, on the so-called 'island', is the Tanlaw Mill, one of the university's social centres – with the main refectory, the Fitness Centre, and the Students' Union Office.

Overlooking this site, on the hill above, is the extensive Chandos Building. This complex contains the Medical School. It also houses the Ian-Fairburn Lecture Theatre, the largest lecture theatre on the river-side site.

Further on, up the hill, on the London Road, is another element of the campus, in particular the School of Law, which is housed in the Franciscan Building, surrounded by other student accommodation blocks. This is opposite the swimming pool and leisure centre. The university has been expanding in recent years. It has acquired a new site on the west side of the river, which will increase the capacity of the river-side campus as a whole.

Organisation and governance

Chancellor

On 24 February 2020, Mary Archer was installed as chancellor of the university,.

Former chancellors included Lord Hailsham of St Marylebone (from 1973 to 1993), Baroness Margaret Thatcher (from 1993 to 1998), Martin Jacomb (from 1999 to 2010), Lord Tanlaw (from 2010 to 2013), Lady Keswick (from 2014 to 2020) and, latterly, Dame Mary Archer.

Vice-chancellor
Since October 2020, the vice-chancellor is Professor James Tooley.

Academic profile

Teaching
The university's schools are: Education; Law; Humanities; Arts and Languages; Business; and Science and Medicine. Each of these is presided over by a dean.

The quality of the university's provision is maintained, as at other UK universities, by an external examiner system (i.e., professors from other universities oversee and report on exams and marking), by an academic advisory council (comprising a range of subject-specialist academics from other universities), and by membership of the Quality Assurance Agency for Higher Education (QAA).

The university was created as a liberal arts college, and still describes itself as such, although in an interview with The Guardian in 2003, then-vice-chancellor Terence Kealey remarked that it had "become a vocational school for law and business for non-British students, because that's where the market has taken us". Consequently, major humanities subjects such as history and politics are no longer offered as stand-alone degrees, instead being combined with economics as a degree in international studies. Economics, however, is available as a stand-alone degree as is English literature, as a single honours subject, and in combinations with English Language, or Journalism, and related areas. The Professor of Economics, and Dean of Humanities, Martin Ricketts, is the chair of the Institute of Economic Affairs Academic Advisory Council.

Some degree programmes at Buckingham, Law for example, place greater emphasis on exams as an assessment method rather than coursework, but in general its degree programmes balance assessment between exams and coursework.

School of Medicine

The Medical School offers postgraduate MD programmes for qualified doctors in a range of specialisations. From January 2015 it offers an undergraduate medical qualification (MBChB) and graduated its first qualified doctors in June 2019. For those reading Medicine as their first degree, the course is shorter than other medical schools in the UK, taking only 4.5 years to complete. The course also has a start month of January. The university accepts international and UK students. The school is known as the University of Buckingham Medical School (UBMS) and is in partnership with Milton Keynes NHS Trust (Milton Keynes University Hospital); Warwick Hospital (South Warwickshire NHS Foundation Trust); Stoke Mandeville Hospital (Buckinghamshire Healthcare NHS Trust) and St. Andrews Hospital, Northampton.

"Alternative" medicine
The university ran a diploma course in "integrated medicine" that was later withdrawn under pressure from David Colquhoun, a campaigner against pseudoscience and alternative medicine. The Dean of the School, Karol Sikora, was a Foundation Fellow of Prince Charles's now-defunct alternative medicine lobby group, The Prince's Foundation for Integrated Health, and is Chair of the Faculty of Integrated Medicine, which is unaffiliated with any university but also includes Rosy Daniel and Mark Atkinson, who co-ordinated Buckingham's "integrated medicine" course. Daniel has been criticised by David Colquhoun for breaches of the Cancer Act 1939, regarding claims she made for Carctol, a herbal dietary supplement with no utility in treating cancer. Andrew Miles is on the scientific council of the College of Medicine an alternative medicine lobby group linked to the Prince of Wales. Sikora is also a "professional member" of this organisation. The degree was stripped off validation by the University of Buckingham prior to the first graduation.

School of Education
The Department of Education has two aspects, research and vocational: it conducts research into education and school provision, and also maintains various PGCE courses for teacher training. The Department of Education has been home to some of the most prominent educationalists in Britain, including the late Chris Woodhead (former head of Ofsted) and Anthony O'Hear (director of the Royal Institute of Philosophy). Its postgraduate certificate in education – which deals with both the state and the independent sector – is accredited with Qualified Teacher Status which means that it also qualifies graduates to teach in the state sector.

Business School
The University of Buckingham has a Business School which offers a range of undergraduate and postgraduate qualifications for students. Ranked sixth out of 123 in the UK in student satisfaction (The Guardian University League Tables 2019). The University of Buckingham was ranked 123rd out of 130 universities in the University League Tables 2022.

The Dean of the Business school is Dr Debarpita Bardhan-Correia. A range of undergraduate and postgraduate business, entrepreneurship, accounting and finance degrees are offered by the Business School.

There are a number of lecturers including many BLEU (Buckingham Lean Enterprise Unit) certified ones, which are individuals who have completed a MSc with the university since 1999. There are also a number of lecturers who are CIM certified.

Vinson Centre for Economics and Entrepreneurship
On 28 November 2018 the University of Buckingham opened the Vinson Building, a multi-purposed facility for use by Buckingham's students and the local community. The university's Business Enterprise undergraduates and businesses that are members of Buckinghamshire Business First use the Buckingham Enterprise Hub, which is located in the Vinson Building.

Degrees
The university offers traditional degrees over a shorter than usual time-frame. Students at Buckingham study for eight terms over two years, rather than nine terms over three, which (with extra teaching) fits a three-year degree into two years. (The MBChB course lasts 4.5 years.)

Because Buckingham's degrees take two years to complete, students view its degrees as cost-effective compared to other UK university courses, once the income from an extra year's employment is taken into account. In some subject areas, notably Humanities, the university is now offering its degrees over different time-scales, i.e., the 2-year 'intensive' model, working the extra summer term per year, and the traditional 3-year model with the usual summer break each year.

External degrees and validation
The university awards undergraduate and graduate (Masters/MBA) degrees to students who have studied at the Sarajevo School of Science and Technology.

The university validated courses in medicine at Medipathways College, a small private college based in London. Medipathways operates dentistry and medicine courses. In late 2014 Medipathways was found by the Higher Education Quality Assurance Agency 'to be at serious risks of failure'; the university disagreed with the assessment. The company was wound up in September 2019.

Research
The Humanities Research Institute includes academics working in a range of disciplines, particularly military history, security studies, political history, the history of art, 19th-century literature and social history.

Alan Smithers runs the Centre for Education and Employment Research (CEER), from within the School of Humanities.

From the English department, John Drew runs Dickens Journals Online, the project which has put the whole of Dickens's journalistic output on free-access on the web.

Reputation and rankings

The university was awarded the Times/Sunday Times University of the Year for Teaching Quality 2015–16 in 2015, at which time it ranked 38th in the Times/Sunday Times league table. The university is not listed in the Guardian University Guide. The Complete University Guide has seen a steady decline in Buckingham's ranking, from 20th in 2011 to 107th in the 2020 table. The University of Buckingham had fallen again to 123rd out of 130 universities in the University League Tables 2022. It was ranked 17th for graduate employability in 2015. It was ranked joint second for student satisfaction in the 2018 National Student Survey, however a fall in satisfaction in the 2019 National Student Survey saw it fall out of the top ten.

Departments
The league tables of individual subjects in The Guardian University Guide 2020, produced by The Guardian newspaper, ranked Buckingham 10th (out of 101) for Accounting and Finance, 18th (out of 119) for Business Management and Marketing, 6th (out of 71) for Economics, 12th (out of 105) for English and Creative Writing, 28th (out of 101) for Law, and 51st (out of 116) for Psychology. It is noted as teaching Computer Science and Information Systems, History, History of Art, Medicine, and Politics, but not ranked in the subjects.

The subject league tables in the Complete University Guide 2020 ranked Buckingham 79th for Accounting and Finance, 76th for Business & Management, 82nd for Computer Science, 52nd for Economics, 73rd for English, 49th for Law, 73rd for Politics, and 92nd for Psychology. in 2022 Economics had fallen to 69th.

Quality assurance
Buckingham has been reviewed voluntarily by the Quality Assurance Agency for Higher Education (QAA) from 2001. The QAA indicated it had "limited confidence" in the university's management of academic standards in 2008, as the external academic advisory council had "come to see itself as part of the Buckingham academic community" and "serious concerns about academic standards [had] been flagged by external examiners". The university was subsequently judged to "meet UK expectations" in its 2012 review. In 2015 the QAA found that Buckingham had failed to follow the university's regulations on academic misconduct with respect to possible plagiarism by students. An "alternative providers" (i.e. private universities) review by the QAA in 2017 found again that Buckingham met UK expectations in all areas.

In June 2017 the university was judged by the Teaching Excellence Framework panel to be "of the highest quality found in the UK" and given a gold award.

In December 2022,  England’s higher education regulator OfS (Office for Students) fined the university for publishing its 2019 audited accounts two years late, citing a "“significant regulatory risk”. The auditors of the accounts noted "“the existence of a material uncertainty which may cast significant doubt about the group’s and the university’s ability to continue as a going concern”. The 2020 and 2021 accounts had to that date not been published.

University of Buckingham Press
The University of Buckingham Press publishes in the areas of law, education, and business through its journal articles, books, reports and other material. In 2006 the press relaunched The Denning Law Journal and it is now available in print and its whole archive is online.

It also publishes three other journals: The Buckingham Journal of Language and Linguistics, The Journal of Prediction Markets, and The Journal of Gambling Business and Economics. It has a co-publishing arrangement with Policy Exchange for its Foundations series.

Notable alumni

British alumni include Bader Ben Hirsi, playwright and director; The Rt Hon Brandon Lewis CBE, MP for Great Yarmouth, Secretary of State for Northern Ireland; Mark Lancaster, Lord Lancaster of Kimbolton, former Armed Forces minister; Graham Roos, appointed in 2011 as the university's first Creative Artist in Residence; James Henderson (former CEO of Bell Pottinger); Michael Ellis, MP for Northhampton, serving Minister for the Cabinet Office since 2022 and Paymaster General since 2021.

International alumni include Anifah Aman, Minister of Foreign Affairs of Malaysia from April 2009 to May 2018. Mohammadin Ketapi, a government minister in Malaysia; Pravind Jugnauth, MP in the National Assembly of Mauritius, former Deputy Prime Minister, and leader of one of Mauritius's main parties, the Militant Socialist Movement; Mahamudu Bawumia, Current Vice-President of Ghana, since 7 January 2016, and former deputy Governor of The Bank of Ghana; Lawyer Alexander Kwamina Afenyo-Markin, the Member of the Parliament of Effutu (Ghana parliament constituency); Olagunsoye Oyinlola, former Governor of Osun State, Nigeria; racing driver Marc Gené, winner of the Le Mans 24-Hour Race in 2009; Mariano Hugo, Prince of Windisch-Graetz, current head of the Austria-Italian, House of Windisch-Graetz; BMW heiress, Susanne Hanna Ursula Klatten; and Yosef Elron (a current Justice at the Supreme Court of Israel).

Notable academics

Past

Norman P. Barry (1944–2008), political philosopher
Anne Beloff-Chain (1921–1991), biochemist
Mark Blaug (1927–2011), economist 
Bruce Charlton, Visiting Professor of Theoretical Medicine (retired)
Olufemi Elias, lecturer in law (retired) 
Robert Garner, political scientist 
John Jewkes  (1902–1988), economist
Geraint Jones, dean of School of Education, 2014–2018
Terence Kealey (born 1952), former Vice-Chancellor 
Andrew George Lehmann (1922–2006), Professor of European Studies
Ram Mudambi, lecturer in business strategy  
Dennis O'Keeffe (1939–2014), Professor of Social Science
Sir Alan Peacock (1922–2014), economist
Robert A. Pearce (born 1951), Professor in Law 1990–2003
Anthony Seldon, Vice-Chancellor, 2015–2020
Nicolaus Tideman (born 1943), economist 
Chris Woodhead (1946–2015), professor of education
Sir David Yardley (1929–2014), Rank Foundation Professor of Law 1980–1982

Present

Susanna Avery-Quash, art historian 
Hugh Belsey, art historian 
Lloyd Clark, military historian 
Saul David, military historian 
John M. L. Drew, Professor of English Literature
Gert-Rudolf Flick, Visiting Professor in art history
Simon Sebag Montefiore, Visiting Professor in humanities 
Julian Morris, Visiting Professor in economics 
Anthony O'Hear, Professor of Philosophy
Jane Ridley, professor of modern history 
Karol Sikora, Professor of Medicine
Alan Smithers, Director of the Centre for Education and Employment Research
James Tooley (born 1959), Vice-Chancellor

Notes

References

External links
 University of Buckingham website

 
Educational institutions established in 1976
Buckingham University
Libertarian organisations based in the United Kingdom
Buckingham
1976 establishments in England
Buckingham